AMD Wraith is a lineup of CPU coolers designed by AMD. The lineup has currently been expanded to consist of four coolers, varying in cooling capabilities and lighting features, and are included with all of AMD's Socket AM4-based CPU products except 5700X, 5800X, 5800X3D, 5900X, 5950X. The coolers were made by Cooler Master.

Models

The original AMD Wraith was included with select FX CPUs and featured a copper base and four heatpipes.
The current Wraith models are:

 Wraith Stealth - The most basic offering.
 Wraith Spire - Offered in two variants, one with and one without a programmable RGB LED ring.
 Wraith Prism - The top-of-the-line cooler. Features a copper base, heat pipes and programmable RGB lighting.
 Wraith Max - Only available as an aftermarket upgrade. Features a copper base, heat pipes and programmable RGB lighting.

See also
 Ryzen
 Threadripper
 Epyc

References

External links
 Official site

Computer hardware cooling
AMD products